Parelodina is a butterfly genus in the family Lycaenidae. It is monotypic, containing only the species Parelodina aroa. endemic to New Guinea

References

Polyommatini
Monotypic butterfly genera
Lycaenidae genera